Herschel Catalogue may refer to:

 Herschel Space Observatory catalogue of observations
 Catalogues published by William Herschel and Caroline Herschel
 Catalogue of Nebulae and Clusters of Stars  catalogued by William and Caroline Herschel
 Catalogues published by John Herschel
 General Catalogue of Nebulae and Clusters of Stars, catalogued by John Herschel
 J.L.E. Dreyer's New General Catalogue and Index Catalogues, which expanded on the William, Caroline, John Herschel catalogues
 Herschel 400 Catalogue, a subset of the Herschels' catalogues for amateur astronomers